Wufeng District is a suburban district in southern Taichung, Taiwan. It is the location of Taiwan Provincial Consultative Council.

Wufeng is a mainly agricultural town. It was heavily damaged by the Jiji earthquake on 21 September 1999, which caused around 100 deaths in the town. The 921 Earthquake Museum of Taiwan, which commemorates the giant quake, is built at what was formerly Guangfu Junior High School, which was destroyed when part of the school was uplifted by the Chelungpu Fault during the quake.

The two major geographical features of this town are the Wu Xi (Wu Stream), which forms the town's southern border, and Xiangbi Shan (Elephant Trunk Mountain), which lies in the eastern part of the township.

History 
Formerly called Atabu.

Administrative divisions 

Tonglin, Jifeng, Jiayin, Benxiang, Zhongzheng, Jinrong, Laiyuan, Bentang, Beiliu, Nanliu, Side, Wufu, Dingtai, Beishi, Nanshi, Wanfeng, Jiuzheng, Kengkou, Fenggu Liugu Village.

Geography 
 Area: 98.08 km2
 Population: 64,094 people (February 2023)

Education 
 Asia University
 Chaoyang University of Technology

Government institutions 

 Bureau of Cultural Heritage
 K-12 Education Administration
 National Taiwan Symphony Orchestra

Tourist attractions 
921 Earthquake Museum of Taiwan
 Asia Museum of Modern Art
 Assembly Affairs Museum, The Legislative Yuan
 Lin Hsien-tang Residence Museum
 National Taiwan Symphony Orchestra
 Wufeng Lin Family Mansion and Garden
 Jiujiu Feng (Ninety-nine peaks)
 Memorial Park of the Taiwan Provincial Council
Tong-Lin Ecological Park
 Taiwan Mushroom Museum

Transportation

Roads

Freeway 
National Freeway No.3 Wufeng Interchange

National Freeway No.6 Jiujeng Interchange

Provincial Way 
Provincial Highway 3

Provincial Highway 63 (Zhongtou Highway)

Buses  
17

50 (rides from 921 Earthquake Museum to Beitun District)

53 (rides to Wenxin Road, Nantun District)

59

107 (rides to Nantun District)

108 (rides from Beitun District to Tsaotun, Nantou)

131

132

151 (rides to High Speed Rail Taichung Station)

201 (rides from Asia University to North District)

281

282

Notable natives 
 Tang Yao-ming, Minister of National Defense (2002–2004)

See also 
 Taichung

References

External links 

  
 霧峰Wufeng, Taichung阿罩霧Ataabu (Fan Page on Facebook)

Districts of Taichung
Taiwan placenames originating from Formosan languages